Aclypea opaca is a species of carrion beetle in the family Silphidae. It is found in Europe and Northern Asia (excluding China) and North America.

References

Further reading

External links

 

Silphidae
Articles created by Qbugbot
Beetles described in 1758
Taxa named by Carl Linnaeus